Below are the squads for the 1972 Palestine Cup of Nations, hosted in Iraq, and which took place between 1 and 25 January 1972.

Group A

Egypt
Head coach:

Iraq
Head coach: Adil Basher

Kuwait

Libya

Group B

Algeria
Head coach: Rachid Mekhloufi

Palestine
Head coach:

Qatar

South Yemen

Syria

External links
Palestine Cup 1972 - rsssf.com

1972